A hockey stick is:
 a stick used to propel the ball or puck in hockey. In particular:
 Field hockey stick, used to propel the ball in field hockey
 Ice hockey stick, used to propel the puck in ice hockey
 Underwater hockey stick, used to propel the puck in underwater hockey
 something shaped like an ice hockey stick
 Saab hockey stick, styling cue on Saab cars
 Hockey stick graph (global temperature) is a presentation of the global or hemispherical mean temperature record of the past 1000 years
 a hockey stick diagram is a diagram that shows the payoff of a call option or a put option with respect to the price of the underlying asset.
 a hockey stick procedure turn is the standard way to reverse direction during an instrument landing in aviation.
 Other uses:
 the name of a step in Cha-cha-cha.

See also 

 Honey dipper